Albert L. Phillips (May 12, 1824 - 1893) was a member of the Wisconsin State Assembly and the Wisconsin State Senate.

Biography
Phillips was born on May 12, 1824 in Adams, Massachusetts. He later moved to Racine, Wisconsin. He died there in 1893.

Career
Phillips was a member of the Assembly during the 1869 and 1870 sessions before representing the 3rd District in the Senate during the 1881 and 1882 sessions. Additionally, he was an alderman (similar to city councilman) and Assessor of Racine. He was a Republican.

References

1824 births
1893 deaths
People from Adams, Massachusetts
Politicians from Racine, Wisconsin
Republican Party Wisconsin state senators
Republican Party members of the Wisconsin State Assembly
Wisconsin city council members